This is a list of winners and nominees of the Primetime Emmy Award for Outstanding Period and/or Character Hairstyling.

In the following list, the first titles listed in gold are the winners; those not in gold are nominees, which are listed in alphabetical order. The years given are those in which the ceremonies took place:

Winners and nominations

2020s

References

Outstanding Period and or Character Hairstyling
Hairdressing
Awards established in 2020